The Serbian women's university basketball team ( / Ženska univerzitetska košarkaška reprezentacija Srbije) represents Serbia at the Summer Universiade and is controlled by the Basketball Federation of Serbia, the governing body for basketball in Serbia.

External links
 Basketball Federation of Serbia

U
Serbia at the Summer Universiade